Nadezhda Viktorovna Torlopova (born 23 November 1978) is a Russian boxer. She is the 2010 AIBA World Champion.

Career
Torlopova competed in women's middleweight boxing at the 2012 Summer Olympics in London, United Kingdom, winning the silver medal, after losing to American boxer Claressa Shields 12–19 in the gold medal bout. She retired soon afterwards.

Personal life
Torlopova is married to her husband and has one son and two daughters.

References

1978 births
Living people
Boxers at the 2012 Summer Olympics
Olympic boxers of Russia
Russian women boxers
Olympic silver medalists for Russia
Olympic medalists in boxing
Medalists at the 2012 Summer Olympics
AIBA Women's World Boxing Championships medalists
Middleweight boxers